Aleksandar Jovanović (born 26 October 1984) is a professional Bosnian Serb footballer.

Club career
He played with FK Leotar where started playing as a senior. In 2005, he moved to Serbia where signed with SuperLiga club FK Hajduk Kula where he played until 2011.

Ahead of the 2019/20 season, Jovanović joined Szeged 2011.

Club statistics

Updated to games played as of 19 May 2019.

Honours
Ferencváros
Hungarian League Cup (1): 2012–13

References

External sources
 Aleksandar Jovanović Stats at Utakmica.rs

1984 births
Living people
Footballers from Sarajevo
Serbs of Bosnia and Herzegovina
Association football midfielders
Bosnia and Herzegovina footballers
Bosnia and Herzegovina youth international footballers
Bosnia and Herzegovina under-21 international footballers
FK Leotar players
Serbian SuperLiga players
FK Hajduk Kula players
Ferencvárosi TC footballers
Debreceni VSC players
Szeged-Csanád Grosics Akadémia footballers
Nemzeti Bajnokság I players
Nemzeti Bajnokság II players
Bosnia and Herzegovina expatriate footballers
Expatriate footballers in Serbia
Expatriate footballers in Hungary
Bosnia and Herzegovina expatriate sportspeople in Serbia
Bosnia and Herzegovina expatriate sportspeople in Hungary